Shriram Sonkar (born 1962) is an Indian politician and a member of 11th, 13th and 17th Legislative Assembly, Uttar Pradesh of India. He represents the Muhammadabad-Gohna constituency in Mau district of Uttar Pradesh.

Political career
Shriram Sonkar contested Uttar Pradesh Assembly Election as Bharatiya Janata Party candidate and defeated his close contestant Rajendra Kumar from Bahujan Samaj Party with a margin of 538 votes.

Posts held

See also
Uttar Pradesh Legislative Assembly

References

Uttar Pradesh MLAs 2017–2022
1962 births
Living people